Carin Alice Cone (born April 18, 1940), also known by her married name Carin Cone Vanderbush, is an American former competition swimmer, Olympic medalist, and former world record-holder.

She competed at the 1956 Summer Olympics in Melbourne, Australia, where she won a silver medal in the 100-meter backstroke, having the same time (1:12.9 – new world record) as Judy Grinham who was judged as winner.  She also won two gold medals at the 1959 Pan American Games in Chicago.

Cone set seven backstroke world records during her career. In 1984 she was inducted into the International Swimming Hall of Fame.

See also
 List of members of the International Swimming Hall of Fame
 List of Olympic medalists in swimming (women)
 List of University of Houston people
 World record progression 4 × 100 metres medley relay

References

External links
 

1940 births
Living people
American female backstroke swimmers
World record setters in swimming
Olympic silver medalists for the United States in swimming
Pan American Games gold medalists for the United States
People from Huntington, New York
Swimmers at the 1956 Summer Olympics
Swimmers at the 1959 Pan American Games
University of Houston alumni
Medalists at the 1956 Summer Olympics
Pan American Games medalists in swimming
Medalists at the 1959 Pan American Games
21st-century American women